The Anglican Diocese of Uyo is one of ten within the Anglican Province of the Niger Delta, itself one of 14 provinces within the Church of Nigeria. The current bishop is Prince Asukwo Antai.

The first bishop of the diocese was Emmanuel Nglass in 1990. Orama was consecrated a  bishop on November 26, 2006 at the Cathedral Church of the Advent, Abuja. Prince Asukwo Antai was elected on 9 August 2014.

Bishops

Notes

Church of Nigeria dioceses
Dioceses of the Province of Niger Delta